The Hotel Alex Johnson is a historic hotel in Rapid City, South Dakota that opened in 1928.

History
The hotel was built by its namesake, Alex Carlton Johnson, Vice President of the Chicago & North Western Railroad. Construction began on August 19, 1927, just one day before work began on nearby Mount Rushmore and the hotel opened on July 1, 1928 and was officially dedicated on August 11, 1928. The building was designed by Chicago architects Oldefest & Williams.

It was sold to the Eppley Hotel Company, in 1947. That chain was bought by Sheraton Hotels and Resorts in 1956 and the hotel was renamed the Sheraton-Johnson Hotel. Sheraton sold the hotel in 1965, but continued to operate it under a franchise contract until 1968, when it regained its original name.

In media
The Sheraton-Johnson Hotel is mentioned numerous times in dialogue in the 1959 Alfred Hitchcock film North by Northwest as the hotel where the mysterious George Kaplan will be staying. Hitchcock, Cary Grant and Eva Marie Saint stayed at the hotel while filming at nearby Mount Rushmore.

References

External links

Hotels established in 1928
Hotel buildings completed in 1928
Hotels in South Dakota
Hotel Alex Johnson
1928 establishments in South Dakota
Sheraton hotels